Roger Vitrac  (17 November 1899 – 22 January 1952) was a French surrealist playwright and poet.

Early life
Roger Vitrac was born in Pinsac on 17 November 1899, before his family moved to Paris in 1910.:527 As a young man, he was influenced by the period's theatre and poetry, in particular the works of Lautréamont and Alfred Jarry.:527 In the late 1920s he married Kitty Cannell, a dancer and actress who performed at the Provincetown Playhouse.:265

Career 
In 1919 he published his first collection of poems, Le Faune noir. In 1920 he began his obligatory three-year military service.:527 While serving, he was introduced to Dadaist performances in Paris and became interested in the movement. He even 'took to distributing Dada manifestos in the barracks'.:358 He also 'presented a play in Dadaistic character' entitled La Fenêtre Vorace, which has since been lost.:358 It was during this time that he met Marcel Arland, François Baron, Georges Limbour and René Crevel, and founded the literary revue, Aventure.:527In 1921, Vitrac met André Breton and Louis Aragon at the Café Certa, which was one of the headquarters for Dada, and later Surrealist, activities. That same year, he attended the Dadaist Excursion to the Church of Saint-Julien-le-Pauvre and become formally associated with the Dadaists. He would continue to develop this network as a founding member of the Surrealist movement and one of the signatories of Breton's First Surrealist Manifesto (1924). He was expelled from the movement in 1925 for his pursuit of the theatre, among other infractions.:527

Theater Alfred Jarry 
In 1926, Vitrac founded the Théatre Alfred-Jarry with  Robert Aron and Antonin Artaud (who was also expelled from the Surrealist movement). It was here that Vitrac premiered his plays, Les Mystères de l'amour [The Mysteries of Love] (1927), as well as his best known work Victor ou les enfants au pouvoir [Victor, or Power to the Children](1928).

Later works 
Vitrac joined Georges Bataille as one of the signatories of Un Cadavre against Breton and contributed to Documents with articles on "Gaston-Louis Roux" (1929, issue 7), "The Abduction of the Sabines" (1930, issue 6) and a poem, "Humorage to Picasso" (1930, issue 3), dedicated to the artist. From 1931, he worked as a journalist while further exploring burlesque style playwriting, which often operated between boulevard comedy and intimate tragedy. His multi-thematic Coup de Trafalgar (1934) and Les Demoiselles du large (1938) gained as little recognition as his more slapstick plays such as Le Loup-Garou (1939) and Le Sabre de mon père (1951).

In January 1937, Vitrac become Secretary General of the newly established Confédération des Syndicats Professionels Française (CSPF), a workers' union that claimed to be 'purely professional' and 'free of any political affiliation.':212-213

Death 
Vitrac died in Paris on 22 January 1952.:527

Legacy 
Only after his death did Vitrac reach popular stardom with Jean Anouilh's 1962 production of Victor, or Power to the Children. Though it was written after Vitrac was expelled from Surrealist movement, Victor is often viewed as the key masterpiece of surrealist theatre,:94

References

1899 births
1952 deaths
People from Lot (department)
20th-century French dramatists and playwrights
French surrealist writers
Surrealist dramatists and playwrights
Modernist theatre